Finale Emilia is a comune (municipality) in the Province of Modena, in the Italian region Emilia-Romagna, located about  north of Bologna and about  northeast of Modena.

Finale was struck by an earthquake on 20 May 2012, which destroyed or damaged several historical structures, such as the Torre dei Modenesi (a clock tower), and most of both the local castle  and cathedral.

Main sights
Torre dei Modenesi (remains)
Castello delle Rocche, also known as Rocca Estense, built in 1402 by will of Niccolò III of Este, marquis of Ferrara. It has a quadrangular plan with for towers and a central keep (originally built by Boniface III of Tuscany in medieval times). It is currently under restoration after the 2012 earthquake.

Twin towns
 Grézieu-la-Varenne,  France
 Villa Sant'Angelo, Italy
 Formigine, Italy

People
 Jean-Baptiste Ventura (1794–1858) - general in Punjab Kingdom
 Gregorio Agnini (1856–1945) - founder member of Italian Socialist Party
 Giuseppe Pederiali (1937–2013) - writer

References

External links
 Official website
 News on Finale Emilia